The Communist Party of Great Britain (Marxist–Leninist), abbreviated CPGB-ML, is an anti-revisionist, Marxist–Leninist communist party in the United Kingdom, active in England, Scotland, and Wales. The CPGB-ML was created after a split from the Socialist Labour Party (SLP) in 2004. The CPGB-ML publishes the bimonthly newspaper Proletarian, and the Marxist–Leninist journal Lalkar (originally associated with the Indian Workers' Association) is also closely allied with the party. The party chair is Ella Rule.

Founding
The party's origins were in the Association of Communist Workers (ACW), formed by Harpal Brar in 1969 as a breakaway from the Revolutionary Marxist–Leninist League, itself a split from the Communist Party of Great Britain (CPGB). The ACW joined the Socialist Labour Party (SLP), led by former miners' leader Arthur Scargill, but split from it because of Scargill's refusal to accept support for North Korea and other states. As a result, Scargill chose to expel a number of members of the party's central committee and its entire Yorkshire region. Those expelled, along with others who resigned, founded the CPGB-ML on 3 July 2004 in London.

Party ideology
The CPGB-ML adheres to Marxism–Leninism, the political theory adopted by the Communist Party of the Soviet Union. The CPGB-ML praises communist leaders such as Vladimir Lenin, Joseph Stalin, Mao Zedong, Kim Il-sung, Enver Hoxha and Fidel Castro.

The CPGB-ML did not condemn the 2011 England riots, but instead characterised them as a rudimentary form of anti-capitalist resistance that lacked adequate leadership and direction. The CPGB-ML is opposed to immigration controls, which it holds are measures to misdirect workers and blame each other for the crisis rather than the bourgeoisie.

The CPGB-ML opposes Trotskyism, social democracy, democratic socialism and what they term revisionist (including Khruschevite) parties. In 1995 former CPGB-ML chairman Harpal Brar published a book titled Social Democracy: The Enemy Within.

At its 8th congress in September 2018, the party adopted a motion opposing "discrimination on grounds of race, sex or sexual proclivity" but condemning "identity politics, including LGBT ideology" as "reactionary and anti-working class", and declaring members promoting identity politics liable to expulsion. The CPGB-ML have described identity politics as a "reactionary nightmare" imposed by the bourgeoisie. This had led to allegations of transphobia by other organisations belonging to the British left.

Party activity

The CPGB-ML is involved in a number of British political movements such as Palestinian solidarity, anti-austerity, anti-war, anti-Maidan, and opposed to the use of drone strikes by the US and NATO against civilians.

The CPGB-ML holds three annual events:
 A May Day march to Trafalgar Square every year on 1 May.
 An international barbecue which invites members from friendly parties, unionists, and representatives from countries the party supports, particularly North Korea and Cuba, as the barbecue is held near the anniversary of the Korean War and the storming of the Moncada Barracks.
 An October Revolution celebration of the first successful Marxist–Leninist revolution and the creation of the Soviet Union.

The party was known for being the only party to carry a banner of Joseph Stalin, including a quote from Stalin, every year, until 2019, on 1 May International Workers' Day march in London. The quote is from The Foundations of Leninism, a book written by Stalin, saying: "Either place yourself at the mercy of capital, eke out a wretched existence as of old and sink lower and lower, or adopt a new weapon – this is the alternative imperialism puts before the vast masses of the proletariat. Imperialism brings the working class to revolution."

The first election fought by party members was the 2018 Birmingham city council election. Three member-candidates stood under the registered label/sub-party "Birmingham Worker".  Their best result was in the Balsall Heath West ward with 6.1% of the vote and third place, ahead of local Greens and the Tories. In the Brandwood & King's Heath and Stirchley wards the others gained 0.89% and 1.62%, beating the local TUSC candidate in the former.

The CPGB-ML welcomed the founding of the Workers Party of Britain (WPB) by former Labour and Respect party MP George Galloway. Many CPGB-ML members are active in the WPB. The vice-chair of the CPGB-ML Joti Brar, is also the deputy leader of the Workers Party of Britain.

International positions
The CPGB-ML supports governments around the world which it considers to be socialist or anti-imperialist, such as those of China, Venezuela, Russia, Cuba, Zimbabwe, Syria, and Iran. Delegations from the Chinese, Cuban, Venezuelan, North Korean, and Laotian embassies have attended meetings of the CPGB-ML.

The party opposes Zionism and has called for the dissolution of the State of Israel, which it labels as an apartheid state. It called for a defeat of British troops in Iraq and Afghanistan and a movement of direct action and non-cooperation among British working people in order to exert political influence. It was one of many anti-war parties which opposed NATO actions in Libya and Syria and supported the governments of Muammar Gaddafi and Bashar al-Assad.

In 2011, the CPGB-ML party chairman Harpal Brar visited Libya during the war to express solidarity with the Libyan people in their fight against NATO. The CPGB-ML had joined the Stop the War Coalition shortly after the party's formation in 2004, but was ultimately expelled from the coalition. The CPGB-ML said that this was due to its attacks on the STWC leadership's positions on Libya and Syria, which it characterised as "pro-imperialist".

The CPGB-ML's foreign policy stance includes the defence of the legacy of the late ousted President of Zimbabwe, Robert Mugabe.

The CPGB-ML also supports the government of North Korea and what it called its anti-imperialist stance in April 2013, as well as its opposition to Western efforts to discourage the state from acquiring nuclear weapons.

The party supported Brexit in the 2016 referendum. Continuing its commitment to euroscepticism it urged its members during the 2019 European Parliament election in the United Kingdom to vote for the Brexit Party.

The CPGB-ML has shown support for the yellow vests movement which it perceives as a grass-roots working-class movement opposed to capitalism and the European Union. In a similar vein the party supported the Canada convoy protest in late 2021.

The CPGB-ML asserts that the 2022 Russian invasion of Ukraine is a defensive war against "state-sanctioned neo-Nazis" and the "spread of Western hegemony".

Domestic positions

Northern Ireland

The CPGB-ML has called for the withdrawal of British troops from the island of Ireland and for a unified 32-county state to be formed. It supports Sinn Féin's leadership of the Good Friday Agreement, which it believes falls within this framework.

Scotland

The party accepted a position at its 2012 congress that there are no separate English and Scottish nations, but rather, when those nations were at the point of developing as modern capitalist economies, their ruling classes joined together to form a British nation. Though the CPGB-ML believes in local democracy, it sees the Scottish independence movement as diversionary from building a working-class movement across the historic nation of Great Britain and therefore opposes it. It claims that proposals set forward for Scottish independence will not break the Union, the British state, or the British army in any significant manner. In its opposition to Scottish independence, it stands at odds with the Scottish Socialist Party, the Socialist Workers Party and the Socialist Party (England and Wales).

Prominent members
The CPGB-ML has a few members from the early days of the British communist movement and the original CPGB. The current Honorary President is Isabel Crook, wife of David Crook, who celebrated her 100th birthday in 2015. Both were communists who were in Spain during the Spanish Civil War and later went to work for Mao Zedong and the Chinese communists. Veteran British communist Jack Shapiro, a veteran of the anti-revisionist movement and lifelong communist, was a member of the CPGB-ML until his death.

For fourteen years, from the party's founding in 2004 until 2018, the party chairman was the retired university law lecturer, writer and businessman Harpal Brar. The party's vice-chairman and international secretary was Ella Rule, while the party's general secretary was Zane Carpenter. At the 8th party congress in Birmingham in 2018 Harpal Brar stepped down as party chair and was replaced by Ella Rule. Zane Carpenter and Joti Brar became the party's vice chairs.

Latvian Nazbol Beness Aijo was a member during his time living in London.

Despite not being a member, the socialist politician, writer and broadcaster George Galloway has delivered multiple speeches to CPGB-ML events and conferences.

See also
 Stalin Society
 List of political parties in the United Kingdom opposed to austerity

References

External links
 

Communist parties in the United Kingdom
Neo-Stalinist parties
Anti-revisionist organizations
Far-left political parties in the United Kingdom
Communist organisations in the United Kingdom
Eurosceptic parties in the United Kingdom
Anti-austerity political parties in the United Kingdom
Political parties established in 2004
Holodomor denial